Gamburg may refer to:

Places
 Gamburg, Missouri, USA; an unincorporated community
 Gamburg, Main-Tauber, Baden-Württemberg, Germany; a village that was merged into Werbach

People
 Inger Gamburg née Mohr (1892–1979), Danish trade unionist 
 Grigori Gamburg (1900-1967) Soviet violinist
 Yefim Gamburg (1925-2000) Soviet director

Other uses
 Gamburg Castle, a castle in Germany, see List of castles in Baden-Württemberg
 Gamburg (grape), a variety of grape

See also

 
 Gamsberg, a mountain in Switzerland
 Gamsberg Nature Reserve, Namibia
 Gam (disambiguation)
 Hamburg (disambiguation)